Federal Route 5 is one of the three north–south oriented backbone federal road running along the west coast of Peninsular Malaysia, Malaysia. The  federal highway runs from Jelapang, Perak in the north to Skudai, Johor in the south.

Route background

The Federal Route 5 is one of the three north–south backbone federal highways in Peninsular Malaysia; the other two are the Federal Routes 1 and 3. The FT5 highway is also the shortest among the three backbone federal highways. Generally, the Federal Route 5 runs mostly along the west coast of Peninsular Malaysia.

The Kilometre Zero of the Federal Route 5 is located at Skudai, Johor, at its interchange with the Federal Route 1, the main trunk road of the central of Peninsular Malaysia. It begins as an east–west highway from Skudai to Pontian Kechil. Starting from Pontian Kechil, it becomes the main west coastal trunk road of Peninsular Malaysia. At Batu Pahat, the FT5 highway forms a part of the Batu Bahat–Kluang Road from Banang Roundabout to Mount Soga Intersection, but was signed as FT5; the Batu Pahat–Kluang Road assumes the FT50 designation from Mount Soga Intersection onwards. At Mount Soga Intersection, the FT5 highway is diverted to Jalan Peserai FT5 that forms the Muar–Batu Pahat Road FT5 to Parit Jawa. At Parit Jawa, the FT5 route is diverted to Jalan Abdul Rahman FT5 to Muar, where it passes three roundabouts (Khalidi Roundabout, Sulaiman Roundabout and Bentayan Roundabout) before the FT5 route is diverted once again to Jalan Bakri FT5 at Bentayan Roundabout, which later continues as the Sultan Ismail Bridge FT5 and Jalan Kesang FT5.

At Parit Bunga Interchange, the FT5 route is once again diverted to the left to become Lebuh AMJ FT5. At Kesang Interchange, the FT5 route is diverted to the two-lane Melaka–Muar Road FT5, while the Lebuh AMJ itself changes its route number to FT19. Muar–Melaka Road FT5 ends at Duyong Intersection where it overlaps with the Lebuh AMJ FT19 to Semabok Interchange, where the FT5 route is diverted to Jalan Semabok FT5. At Malacca City, the Federal Route 5 passes through a maze of old streets before it becomes Jalan Tengkera FT5 where it forms a part of the Melaka–Port Dickson Road FT5. The Melaka–Port Dickson Road FT5 ends at Lukut, where the FT5 route is rerouted to Jalan Sepang FT5, while the road itself continues as the Seremban–Port Dickson Road FT53.

At Sepang, the Federal Route 5 is rerouted to Jalan Morib FT5. At Morib, the route is diverted twice to Jalan Kelanang FT5 and then Jalan Sultan Alam Shah FT5 to Banting. At Banting, the FT5 road is rerouted to Jalan Langat FT5 to Klang. At Klang, it overlaps with the Federal Route 2 at Jalan Jambatan Kota FT2/FT5 from Simpang Lima Roundabout Interchange to Simpang Tujuh Roundabout Interchange, where the Federal Route 5 is diverted to Jalan Kapar FT5 which forms a part of the Klang–Teluk Intan Road FT5, while Jalan Jambatan Kota itself continues as the Federal Highway Route 2.

At Mile 5, Klang–Teluk Intan Road FT5 near Batak Rabit, the Federal Route 5 is diverted to Sultan Yusuf Bridge FT5 to Sitiawan, while the Klang–Teluk Intan Road changes its route number to FT58. Starting from Sitiawan, Perak to its northern terminus at Ipoh, the Federal Route 5 ceases to be the main coastal trunk road; its role is taken by Federal Route 60 and Federal Route 1. From Sitiawan, the Federal Route 5 is rerouted for the last time to Ipoh–Lumut Highway FT5 to its northern terminus at Jelapang near Ipoh, where the road is linked to the North–South Expressway E1 and Jalan Kuala Kangsar FT1 via Jalan Jelapang A1.

History
The Federal Route 5 started as a short road from Malacca City to Merlimau, constructed in 1887. About a decade later, another road from Ipoh to Lumut was constructed, featuring the Bota Bridge that crossed the Perak River. In 1911, the state government of Johor collaborated with the British colonial government to develop a road network from Johor Bahru to Batu Pahat and Muar. As a result, the Batu Pahat–Kluang–Mersing Road was completed in 1919, where the section of the Banang Roundabout to Mount Soga Intersection formed a part of the present-day Federal Route 5.

The next completed section was the Muar–Batu Pahat Road FT5, completed in 1929. At the same time, the Melaka–Merlimau Road FT5 was extended to Muar as well. Also completed at the same time was the Melaka–Port Dickson Road FT5, which was built as an extension of the Seremban–Port Dickson Road which was completed earlier in 1910. In 1939, the coastal road sections in Selangor from Klang to Sepang and from Klang and Teluk Anson was opened to motorists. The Skudai–Pontian Road FT5 and Batu Pahat–Pontian Road FT5 were also completed in the same year.

In 1967, the old Bota Bridge FT5 was collapsed due to a huge flood, effectively cutting off the transportation link between Ipoh and Lumut. As a result, a new replacement bridge known as the Sultan Idris Shah II Bridge FT5 was constructed with the total cost of RM3.1 million. The new Sultan Idris Shah II Bridge FT5 was completed in 1973 and was opened to motorists in February 1973.

Also in 1967, two bridges at Muar and Batu Pahat were opened to motorists as toll bridges. Funded by a RM9 million loan from Chase Manhattan Bank, the federal government began the construction of both bridges in 1965 and was completed in early 1967. The bridge in Muar was named as Sultan Ismail Bridge. Two toll plazas were erected at Tanjung Agas and Peserai respectively. However, due to numerous protests by motorists, the toll rate was reduced in 1971, before the toll collection was fully abolished in 1975.

In 1970, the Kuala Selangor Bridge FT5 was proposed. However, the project sparked a controversy due to delays caused by the failure of the original contractor to complete the job. As a result, a new tender was opened in 1976 to get a new contractor to complete the abandoned Kuala Selangor Bridge construction job. Meanwhile, the construction of the Sabak Bernam Bridge FT5 was started in 1977. The Kuala Selangor Bridge FT5, together with the Sabak Bernam Bridge FT5, were completed in 1980. The bridge in Kuala Selangor was named as Sultan Salahuddin Abdul Aziz Shah Bridge.

The final section being completed was the Teluk Intan–Sitiawan section. Dubbed as the Sungai Perak–Lumut West Coastal Road Project, the final section of the Federal Route 5 was constructed as a project under the Fifth Malaysia Plan. The project included the 1.3-km Sultan Yusuf Bridge FT5, the longest bridge along the Federal Route 5. Before the bridge was built, villagers from the opposite of the Perak River such as Telok Selandang and Kampung Lekir had to use a river ferry service operated by a nearby oil palm estate. Construction of the Sultan Yusuf Bridge began in April 1986 with the total cost of RM27 million for the entire road project. The bridge was completed in 1988 and was opened to motorists on 17 November 1988, resulting in the full completion of the FT5 highway.

The Federal Route 5 remains heavily used by travellers and commuters along the west coast of Peninsular Malaysia and is unaffected by the presence of the North–South Expressway E1 and E2, as the FT5 highway is located far from the E1 and E2 expressways, besides the fact that the FT5 highway passes through the most populated regions in Peninsular Malaysia. As a result, many sections of the FT5 highway have been upgraded either as divided highways or what are termed super four highways (which can be characterized as superstreets or left-in/left-out expressways). For example, the Klang–Teluk Intan Road has been upgraded to a super four highway, while the Ipoh–Lumut Highway FT5, Jalan Langat FT5 and Pontian Highway are all being upgraded to divided highways, in order to handle the increasing amount of traffic.

On 25 May 2015, the long-anticipated West Coast Expressway E32 began its construction after numerous delays. The 233-km controlled-access expressway from Changkat Jering to Banting was built as a coastal alternative to the North–South Expressway E1 and E2 that becomes congested during holidays and festive seasons. However, the expressway construction sparked yet another controversy, as the Tanjung Karang–Hutan Melintang and Teluk Intan–Lekir sections will be using the existing Federal Route 5, heavily violating the controlled-access expressway standards defined in Arahan Teknik 8/86: A Guide on Geometric Design of Roads by Malaysian Public Works Department (JKR), hence the completed expressway may endanger the lives of local villagers and expressway users as well. As a result, the Malaysian Ministry of Works is considering to re-evaluate the alignment of the expressway, especially along the Tanjung Karang–Hutan Melintang section.

List of junctions and towns (south–north)

References

See also
 West Coast Expressway – an upcoming controlled-access expressway that runs in parallel with the Federal Route 5
 Malaysia Federal Route 3 – the east coastal counterpart of the Federal Route 5

005
Expressways and highways in the Klang Valley
Roads in Selangor